J. R. Koch (pronounced KOTCH) (born September 10, 1976) is a retired American professional basketball player who was drafted in the second round of the 1999 NBA Draft (46th overall) by the New York Knicks following a college career at the University of Iowa. Koch played professionally in the U.S. and Europe for six years and is now a real estate agent.

1976 births
Living people
American expatriate basketball people in Belgium
American expatriate basketball people in France
American expatriate basketball people in Italy
American expatriate basketball people in Turkey
Basketball players from Illinois
Centers (basketball)
FC Mulhouse Basket players
Galatasaray S.K. (men's basketball) players
Iowa Hawkeyes men's basketball players
Las Vegas Silver Bandits players
Limoges CSP players
Montecatiniterme Basketball players
New York Knicks draft picks
Power forwards (basketball)
Sportspeople from Peoria, Illinois
American men's basketball players